A Chit The Lay Pyay is a 2002 romantic-drama film, directed by Ko Aung Min Thein starring Dwe, Eaindra Kyaw Zin, Sai Bo Bo, Phyo Ngwe Soe, Smile and Nawarat. It premiered in Myanmar Cinemas on June 28, 2002.

Cast
Dwe as Nay Min
Eaindra Kyaw Zin as Lay Pyay
Sai Bo Bo as Shan Lay
Phyo Ngwe Soe as Phyo Ngwe Soe
Smile as Ngu Wah
Nawarat as Nway Oo
Win Naing as Ko Kyaw Gyi
Nyaung Nyaung as Pae Si
Kutho as Johnny

References

2002 films
2000s Burmese-language films
Burmese romantic drama films
Films shot in Myanmar
2002 romantic drama films